Me and You is the third studio album by American country music singer Kenny Chesney. It was released in 1996 via BNA Records. Although its lead-off single "Back in My Arms Again" failed to make Top 40, the album's title track and "When I Close My Eyes" both reached number two on the US Billboard Hot Country Singles & Tracks (now Hot Country Songs) charts in 1996. The title track was reprised from Chesney's previous album. "Back Where I Come From" is a cover of Mac McAnally's 1990 single from his album Simple Life, while "When I Close My Eyes" had been recorded by Restless Heart lead singer Larry Stewart on his 1993 debut album Down the Road, and by Keith Palmer before that. "It's Never Easy To Say Goodbye" had been recorded by singer Wynonna Judd on her eponymous debut album. "Back in My Arms Again was previously recorded by Lee Roy Parnell (one of the co-writers) on his 1992 album Love Without Mercy.

Track listing

Personnel
As listed in liner notes
 Mandy Barnett - background vocals
 Eddie Bayers - drums
 Barry Beckett - keyboards
 Kenny Chesney - acoustic guitar, lead vocals
 Paul Franklin - steel guitar
 "Cowboy" Eddie Long - steel guitar
 Terry McMillan - percussion, harmonica
 Phil Naish - keyboards
 Bobby Ogdin - keyboards
 Don Potter - acoustic guitar
 Michael Rhodes - bass guitar
 Brent Rowan - electric guitar
 John Wesley Ryles - background vocals
 Joe Spivey - fiddle
 Dennis Wilson - background vocals
 Curtis "Mr. Harmony" Young - background vocals

Charts

Weekly charts

Singles

Certifications

References

1996 albums
Kenny Chesney albums
BNA Records albums
Albums produced by Barry Beckett